Kristy De Pellegrini (born 8 May 1990) is an Australian rules footballer who played for the Greater Western Sydney Giants in the AFL Women's competition. De Pellegrini was drafted by Greater Western Sydney with their eleventh selection and eighty-first overall in the 2016 AFL Women's draft. She played six matches in her debut season. She was delisted at the end of the 2017 season.

References

External links 

1990 births
Living people
Greater Western Sydney Giants (AFLW) players
Australian rules footballers from New South Wales